Zhulan Qiqike (1928 – September 26, 2011) was a Chinese film director.

Biography
Zhulan Qiqike was born in 1928 in rural Fuxin Mongol Autonomous County, Liaoning.

Artistic work 
In 1946, Zhulan Qiqike joined the Chinese Communist Party, devoting herself to the literary and artistic propaganda work of the party. During the Kuomintang Islamic insurgency, she accompanied the Inner Mongolia Art Troupe to the frontline to perform for the People's Liberation Army. In 1953, during the Korean War, she accompanied the Motherland Condolence Corps to North Korea and performed for the officers and soldiers of the People's Volunteer Army and their wounded and sick.

In the early 1950s, she enrolled in the Northeast Lu Xun Academy of Fine Arts and the Central Academy of Drama's director class, which included Soviet lecturers. She graduated in July 1956, and returned to Inner Mongolia. There she served as deputy head and director of the Inner Mongolia Repertory Theater, deputy director of Inner Mongolia Film Studio, and director of the Federation of Inner Mongolia. During this period she choreographed and directed films such as Prairie Morning Music and Li Wuhai, as well as news film documentaries such as Baogang Album and Red Flag in Inner Mongolia. She also directed the Soviet drama Pradon Klecheko, Young Guards, the Mongolian multi-act drama Golden Eagle, and the large-scale opera Oroqen New Song.

Political life 
Zhulan Qiqike was a member of the First Committee of the Inner Mongolia Autonomous Region Chinese People's Political Consultative Conference. From 1983 to 1991, she served successively as Secretary of the Party Leadership Group, Deputy Director (in charge of work), Director, and Editor-in-Chief of the Broadcasting Administration Bureau of Inner Mongolia Autonomous Region. During this period, and a 77-meter-high TV complex was built on the 40th anniversary of the founding of the Inner Mongolia Autonomous Region. The CPPCC also built 3500 km of [[Microwave transmission
|microwave trunk]] throughout the Inner Mongolia Autonomous Region.

Retirement 
After retiring in 1991, she worked to promote and preserve Mongolian long song. Through her efforts, the first Mongolian long song seminar was held in Hohhot on May 23, 1997. In June 2000, she presided over the Second Mongolian Long Song Seminar. She edited and published "Inner Mongolia Long Song Symposium Collection". She successfully lobbied for the Mongol Clan Chang Tune to be declared as one of the Masterpieces of the Oral and Intangible Heritage of Humanity. For this she received the Outstanding Contributor Award for National Literature and Art by the Ulanhu Foundation. In her later years, she also served as the vice chairman of the Chinese Television Artists Association and the chairman of the Chinese Minority Film Art Research Association.

Death 
On September 26, 2011, Zhulan Qiqike died of illness in Beijing.

References

1928 births
2011 deaths
Chinese people of Mongolian descent
People from Hohhot
Chinese film directors
Chinese women film directors